The Fiat Sedici is a subcompact crossover SUV (B-segment) that was co developed by Fiat and Suzuki, mainly for the market in Europe. Introduced in December 2005, it was manufactured until October 2014 (with the last model year being 2015).

History 
It was introduced in December 2005, at the Bologna Motor Show, and was built at the Magyar Suzuki plant in Hungary. The expected production volume was 60,000 units per year, one third of these to be sold by Fiat, and two thirds sold by Suzuki and badged as the SX4.

The design was created by Giorgetto Giugiaro's Italdesign Giugiaro studio, and was an alternative to mini multi-purpose vehicles (MPV), which have a more "boxy" appearance. It was the official car of the 2006 Winter Olympics. As the car is four wheel drive, it could be considered a 4x4.

As 4x4 is 16, the car is named Sedici, which means "sixteen" in Italian.

By flicking a switch, the driver can change between 4x2 and 4x4 transmission modes. The car also has electronic stability control (ESC) on the options list and a diesel particulate filter (DPF) is a standard feature.

It was the second best selling SUV in the market in Italy in November 2006, and by June 2007, it was the best selling such vehicle. Since 2012, the Sedici has been sold in Israel, with automatic (four speed) or manual (five speed) gearbox. During 2010, the Sedici was withdrawn from the United Kingdom, due to poor sales.

Sedici 4x2 

The front wheel drive version of the Sedici was unveiled in May 2008. It was available with the same engine choices as the 4X4 version and was available in two trim levels: Dynamic and Emotion. The price, in Italy, was around €2000 cheaper than the 4x4 version.

Engines 
There were two engines available: a 1.6 L Suzuki petrol and a 1.9 L Fiat turbodiesel.

Facelift (2009) 
In March 2009, the Sedici was given a more substantial upgrade: A changed front grille, similar to that of the Bravo, and a new bumper. Inside, it had more sophisticated instrumentation, new fabrics, the air conditioning vents were changed, and it had new Euro 5 compliant engines.

The 1.9 litre Multijet engine was replaced by the more modern 2.0 litre Multijet engine producing , also the petrol 1.6 litre engine was upgraded to have , with lower fuel consumption. This coincided with the withdrawal of sales of the Sedici in the United Kingdom, although a handful of facelifted cars were sold there.

Source

Total production

References

External links 

Sedici
OEM Suzuki vehicles
Mini sport utility vehicles
Crossover sport utility vehicles
Cars introduced in 2005
All-wheel-drive vehicles
2010s cars